Vyacheslav Vasilyevich Kostikov (born 24 August 1940) is a Russian diplomat, journalist and writer who served as the press secretary to the first Russian President Boris Yeltsin.

Biography
In 1966, he graduated from MSU Faculty of Journalism. From 1966 to 1967 he worked as an English translator in India. Since 1967 he has been working as a political columnist for the RIA Novosti.

In 1968 Kostikov studied journalism in England, at the University of Sheffield. At the same time, he continued his studies at the Academy of Foreign Trade (1972). Then he started worked for UNESCO (1972–78 and   1982–1988).

From 1992 to 1994 he served as the press secretary of the President of the Russian Federation. In 1994–1996 he was the representative of the Russian Federation at the Vatican and the Sovereign Military Order of Malta.

Presently, he is the Director for Strategic Planning of Russian newspaper Argumenty i Fakty.

References

External links
 Биография на сайте Клуба выпускников МГУ
 Биография на сайте c-society.ru
 Список послов РФ по странам

1940 births
Living people
Journalists from Moscow
Soviet journalists
Russian male journalists
Russian journalists
Kremlin Press Secretaries
Communist Party of the Soviet Union members
20th-century Russian writers
Diplomats from Moscow
Ambassador Extraordinary and Plenipotentiary (Russian Federation)
Ambassadors of Russia to the Holy See